There are approximately 372,905 listed buildings in England and 2.5% of these are Grade I.  This page is a list of these buildings in the county of Berkshire, ordered by building name within place name within district.

Bracknell Forest

|}

Reading

|}

Slough

|}

West Berkshire

|}

Windsor and Maidenhead

|}

Wokingham

|}

See also
 Grade II* listed buildings in Berkshire

Notes

References

External links

 
Berkshire
Lists of listed buildings in Berkshire